The Archdiocese of Monterrey is a Latin Church ecclesiastical territory or archdiocese of the Catholic Church located in Monterrey, Nuevo León, Mexico.

The Archdiocese of Monterrey is a metropolitan see; its suffragan dioceses are the Ciudad Victoria, Linares, Matamoros, Nuevo Laredo, Piedras Negras, Saltillo and Tampico.

History
The Diocese of Monterrey was erected by Papal Bull "Relata Semper" by Pope Pius VI on December 15, 1777. The diocese's territory was taken from the Dioceses of Mexico, Michoacan and, mainly, Guadalajara. It encompassed the modern states of Nuevo Leon, Coahuila, Tamaulipas and Texas. It was first called the Diocese of Linares, then Linares-Monterrey. Its name was changed to Monterrey on June 9, 1922.

Bishops

Ordinaries
 Juan Antonio de Jesús Sacedón Sánchez † (1778–1779)
 Rafael José Verger y Suau (1782–1790)
 Andrés Ambrosio de Llanos y Valdés (1791–1799)
 Primo Feliciano Marín y Porras (1801–1815)
 José Ignacio de Arancibia y Hormaguei (1817–1821)
 José María de Jesús Belaunzarán y Ureña (1831–1838)
 Salvador de Apodaca y Loreto (1842–1844)
 Jose Ignacio Sánchez Navarro (1851–1852)
 Francisco de Paula Verea y González (1853–1879) named Bishop of Tlaxcala
 José María Ignacio Montes de Oca y Obregón (1879–1884) named Bishop of San Luis Potosí
 Blasius Enciso (1884–1885)
 Jacinto López y Romo (1886–1899) named Archbishop of Guadalajara
 Santiago de los Santos Garza Zambrano (1900–1907)
 Leopoldo Ruiz y Flóres (1907–1911) named Archbishop of Michoacán
 Francisco Plancarte y Navarrete (1912–1920)
 José Juan de Jesús Herrera y Piña (1921–1927)
 José Guadalupe Ortíz y López (1929–1940)
 Guillermo Tritschler y Córdova (1941–1952)
 Alfonso Espino y Silva (1952–1976)
 José de Jesús Tirado Pedraza (1976–1983)
 Adolfo Suárez Rivera (1983–2003) elevated to Cardinal in 1994
 Francisco Robles Ortega (2003–2011) named Archbishop of Guadalajara; elevated to Cardinal in 2007
 Rogelio Cabrera López (2012–present)

Coadjutor bishop
Alfonso Espino y Silva (1951–1952)

Auxiliary bishops
José Guadalupe Ortíz y López (1926–1929), appointed Archbishop here
José de Jesús Tirado Pedraza (1973–1976), appointed Archbishop here
Luis Reynoso Cervantes (1978–1982), appointed Bishop of Ciudad Obregón, Sonora
Alfonso de Jesús Hinojosa Berrones (1985–2000)
Gustavo Rodriguez Vega (2001–2008), appointed Bishop of Nuevo Laredo, Tamaulipas
Alfonso Cortés Contreras (2005–2009), appointed Bishop of Cuernavaca, Morelos
José Lizares Estrada (2007–2009)
Jorge Alberto Cavazos Arizpe (2009–2012), appointed Apostolic Administrator of Nuevo Laredo, Tamaulipas
Alfonso Gerardo Miranda Guardiola (2014–present)
Juan Armando Pérez Talamantes (2014–present)
Heriberto Cavazos Pérez (2016–present)
Oscar Efraín Tamez Villarreal (2016–present)
Juan Carlos Arcq Guzmán (2020–present)
José Manuel Garza Madero (2020–present)
César Garza Miranda (2020–present)

Other priests of this diocese who became bishops
José Guadalupe Galván Galindo, appointed Bishop of Ciudad Valles, San Luís Potosí in 1994
Miguel Angel Alba Díaz, appointed Auxiliary Bishop of Antequera, Oaxaca in 1995
Eduardo Porfirio Patiño Leal, appointed Bishop of Córdoba, Veracruz in 2000
Alonso Gerardo Garza Treviño, appointed Bishop of Piedras Negras, Coahuila in 2003
Ruy Rendón Leal, appointed Prelate of El Salto, Durango in 2005
Hilario González García, appointed Bishop of Linares, Nuevo León in 2014

See also
List of Roman Catholic archdioceses in México

References

External links

 

Monterrey
Monterrey
Culture of Laredo, Texas
Roman Catholic ecclesiastical provinces in Mexico
A
Religious organizations established in 1777
Monterrey
1777 establishments in New Spain